Pierre Joseph Louis Selderslagh (14 November 1872 – 23 January 1955) was a Belgian fencer. He competed in the individual foil masters event at the 1900 Summer Olympics.

References

External links
 

1872 births
1955 deaths
Belgian male fencers
Belgian foil fencers
Olympic fencers of Belgium
Fencers at the 1900 Summer Olympics
Sportspeople from Brussels